Grim Reality is the debut album of American hip hop group Insane Poetry. Released on August 18, 1992, the album peaked at #98 on the Billboard Top R&B/Hip-Hop Albums chart and managed to sell 35,000 copies without any support or promotion. Allmusic reviewer Alex Henderson wrote, "Sounding like a cross between a horror movie and an audio documentary on societal breakdown...a CD this graphic isn't for everyone, but those who aren't turned off by all of the violent, shocking imagery will find Grim Reality to be compelling."

Track listing

Singles

Charts

References

1992 debut albums
Insane Poetry albums
Horrorcore albums
Nastymix Records albums